Pércival Antonio Piggott Cumming (born 23 November 1966 in Panama City, Panama) is a Panamanian former footballer who played professionally for clubs in Panama, El Salvador, Honduras and Costa Rica.

Club career
Piggott scored a goal but still was on the losing side in the 1989/89 Salvadoran league final with Cojutepeque, when they were beaten on penalties by Luis Ángel Firpo after the game ended 2-2 after extra time. He also played for Firpo twice, the second spell started in March 2001 when arriving from Panamanian club San Francisco. He played in Costa Rica for Herediano and in Honduras for Victoria and he returned to Costa Rica in August 2001 when he joined Municipal Liberia. He retired in 2007.

International career
Piggott made his debut for Panama in a May 1987 Olympic Games qualification match against El Salvador and has earned a total of 43 caps, scoring 2 goals. He represented his country in 15 FIFA World Cup qualification matches and played at the 1993 CONCACAF Gold Cup.

His final international was a November 2000 FIFA World Cup qualification match against Trinidad and Tobago.

International goals
Scores and results list Panama's goal tally first.

Managerial career
After retiring as a player, Piggott worked as a pundit for Panamanian TV. In March 2010, Piggott was appointed manager of Sporting San Miguelito.

Personal life
His son Romario Piggott joined his dad's former club Tauro from Chepo ahead of the 2015 Clausura.

References

External links
 

1966 births
Living people
Sportspeople from Panama City
Association football wingers
Panamanian footballers
Panama international footballers
1993 CONCACAF Gold Cup players
1993 UNCAF Nations Cup players
1997 UNCAF Nations Cup players
Tauro F.C. players
C.D. Luis Ángel Firpo footballers
C.D. Victoria players
C.S. Herediano footballers
San Francisco F.C. players
Municipal Liberia footballers
Sporting San Miguelito players
Panamanian expatriate footballers
Panamanian expatriate sportspeople in El Salvador
Panamanian expatriate sportspeople in Honduras
Panamanian expatriate sportspeople in Costa Rica
Expatriate footballers in El Salvador
Expatriate footballers in Honduras
Expatriate footballers in Costa Rica
Panamanian football managers